Westland Helicopters was a British aircraft manufacturer. Originally Westland Aircraft, the company focused on helicopters after the Second World War.  It was amalgamated with several other British firms in 1960 and 1961.

In 2000, it merged with Italian helicopter manufacturer Agusta to form AgustaWestland. In 2016, AgustaWestland merged into Leonardo, where it became the company's helicopters division under the Leonardo Helicopters brand.

History

Origins

Westland Aircraft was founded in 1935 when Petters Limited split its aircraft manufacturing from its aircraft engine concerns. During the Second World War the company produced military aircraft including the Lysander, the Whirlwind and the Welkin.

After the war, the company began to build helicopters under a licensing agreement with Sikorsky.  From the mid-1950s the company came to increasingly concentrate on helicopters, eventually to the exclusion of other types.  Production started with the Sikorsky S-51, which became the Westland Dragonfly, flying for the first time in 1948 and entering service with the Royal Navy and Royal Air Force in 1953.  Westland developed an improved version, the Widgeon, which was not a great success. Success with the Dragonfly was repeated with the Sikorsky S-55 which became the Whirlwind, and a re-engined Sikorsky S-58 in both turboshaft and turbine engine powered designs as the Wessex.

1960s
The chairmanship of Eric Mensforth from 1953–1968 marked the start of the transition, which was aided by the government when in 1959–1961 they forced the merger of the 20 or so aviation firms into three groups. British Aircraft Corporation and Hawker Siddeley Group took over fixed-wing designs, while the helicopter divisions of Bristol, Fairey and Saunders-Roe (with their hovercraft) were merged with Westland to form Westland Helicopters in 1961.

Westland inherited the Saro Skeeter helicopter, a development of the Cierva W.14 Skeeter and the Fairey Rotodyne compound gyroplane design.  They continued to develop the latter, terminating their own Westland Westminster large transport design.

The company continued to produce other aircraft under licence from Sikorsky (Sea King) and Bell (Sioux). They also produced their own designs: the Westland Scout and its naval variant the Westland Wasp from the P.531, which found favour with the Army Air Corps and Fleet Air Arm respectively.

In the late 1960s, the company began a collaboration with Aérospatiale to manufacture three new helicopters, the Aérospatiale Puma, Aérospatiale Gazelle and Westland Lynx, with the last being a Westland design.

1970s
Through Saunders-Roe, Westland became first a part owner then, from 1970, the sole owner of the British Hovercraft Corporation, subsequently trading as Westland Aerospace. Most designs were Saunders-Roe or Saunders-Roe derivatives.

For many years Westland owned the main London heliport at Battersea.

1980s
The company gradually fell into unprofitability. Sikorsky approached with a bail-out deal in 1985 that split the cabinet and led to the resignation of Defence Secretary Michael Heseltine in January 1986 over the fate of Britain's sole helicopter manufacturer. The split, which became known as the Westland affair, was over whether to push the company into a European deal or accept the US company's offer. Eventually, the link with Sikorsky was accepted. This saw both Sikorsky and Fiat acquire minority shareholdings in Westland. In 1988 GKN bought a 22% share of Westland from Hanson plc and Fiat.

In 1984, Westland proposed the WG 44 light attack helicopter based on the Lynx dynamics, incorporating low observable technologies derived from its SUPERVISOR and PHOENIX UAS projects experience in 1977–1983.
In 1987, in parallel with the Agusta A129 supported by Westland, Fokker, MBB and CASA, its WG 47 development was completed as a confidential private venture with a faceted fuselage, internal weapons and twin canted tail rotors.
A side-exiting infrared suppressor integrated the exhausts and its tandem cockpit with the pilot in front had transparencies angled outward to eliminate optical glint.
This presaged the US Army Boeing–Sikorsky RAH-66 Comanche, rolled out in 1995 and cancelled in 2004, while the fuselage shaping was retained for the NH90.

1990s
In the 1990s, the company returned to profitability and grew as a result of several major contracts from the UK Ministry of Defence for EH101 Merlin helicopters and for 67 licence-built Boeing AH-64 Apache attack helicopters, designated the WAH-64 and entering full operational service in 2005.

In April 1994, Westland became a wholly owned subsidiary of GKN. In 2000 GKN and Finmeccanica agreed to merge their Westland and Agusta helicopter subsidiaries into a joint venture, Agusta Westland.  GKN contributed Westland, its 50% share in its EH Industries (EHI) joint venture with Finmeccanica, the GKN aerospace transmissions business, and a 50% share in Aviation Training International. Finmeccanica contributed Agusta, including its transmissions and structures business, its share of EHI, its share of NH Industries, and its share of Bell Helicopter Textron.

On 26 May 2004, GKN confirmed that it had agreed to sell its share of AgustaWestland to Finmeccanica for £1.06 billion. The sale was approved by the British government in October 2004.

The former Westland site at the now unused airfield in Weston-super-Mare houses The Helicopter Museum featuring a number of examples of Westland aircraft.

Products

Helicopters

 WS-51 - Westland Dragonfly
 WS-55 - Westland Whirlwind
 Westland Widgeon
 WG-58 - Westland Wessex
 Westland Westminster (1958) – prototype stage only
 Westland Scout
 Westland Wasp
 Westland Sioux
 WS-61 - Westland Sea King
 Westland Puma
 Westland Gazelle
 WG.13 - Westland Lynx
 WG.30 - Westland 30
 EHI EH101
 Westland WAH-64 Apache
 Bristol Belvedere
 Fairey Rotodyne

Hovercraft
 GKN Westland AP1-88

Rockets and missiles
 Black Arrow

Precision gears
Airship Industries Skyship 500 - transmission system

Unmanned aerial vehicles
 Westland Mote
 Westland Wisp
 Westland Wideye

See also
Aerospace industry in the United Kingdom

References

 James, Derek N. Westland: A History. Gloucestershire UK: Tempus Publishing Ltd, 2002. .
 Mondey, David. Westland (Planemakers 2). London: Jane's Publishing Company, 1982. .
 James, Derek N. 'Westland Aircraft since 1915'. London: Putnam, 1991.

External links
 (Leonardo web site)
 The hovercraft of the Westlands Aircraft Group (including Saunders-Roe and British Hovercraft Corporation)
 Westland at Helis.com : timeline and database section

 
.
Defunct helicopter manufacturers
Helicopter manufacturers of the United Kingdom
Defunct aircraft manufacturers of the United Kingdom
Companies based in Yeovil
British companies established in 1961
Vehicle manufacturing companies established in 1961
Manufacturing companies disestablished in 2000
1961 establishments in England
2000 disestablishments in England